Yangmei Station may refer to:
 Yangmei Station (Taiwan), a railway station in Taiwan
 Yangmei Station (Shenzhen), a station of Shenzhen Metro in Guangdong province, China